Set of irons can refer to:

 a set of iron (golf) clubs
 Fetters
 a "married set" used by firefighters, consisting of a halligan bar and a flathead axe